The 12127/12128 Chhatrapati Shivaji Maharaj Terminus - Pune Junction Intercity Superfast Express is an Express train belonging to Indian Railways that runs between Mumbai CSMT and Pune Junction in India. It is a daily service. It operates as train number 12127 from Mumbai CSMT to Pune Junction and as train number 12128 in the reverse direction.

History 

The train was introduced in 2004 in place of Mumbai-Pune Shatabdi Express, a 10 coach air conditioned train that used to run with AC chair car and 2 End-On-Generation coaches. The Shatabdi Express ran almost empty despite being given a good priority on the route with fewer stops and more speed, due to high fares and increased demands for a "middle class friendly" train, and was thus discontinued.

Coaches

The Mumbai Pune Intercity Express has 2 AC chair cars, 8 general second class, 4 general second class coaches unreserved, and 2 generator car coaches. 
Total = 16

As is customary with Indian Railways, coaches are added/removed as per the demand.

Starting 6 June 2018, Mumbai Pune Intercity Express has been allotted the modern and advanced LHB coach for safety and speed.

Now this train runs at a maximum speed of 130 km per hour between Khadki Pune route with an Ajni WAP 7 locomotive.

Service

The Mumbai Pune Intercity Superfast Express was introduced on 15 March 2004 and is one of 6 dedicated intercity chair car trains between Mumbai CSMT and Pune Junction.  The other 5 trains are 11007/08 Deccan Express, 11009/10 Sinhagad Express, 12125/26 Pragati Express, 12123/24 Deccan Queen & 22105/06 Indrayani Express.

It covers the distance of 192 kilometres in 2 hours 40 mins as 12127 Mumbai Pune Intercity Express (72 km/hr) and 2 hours 35 mins as Pune Mumbai Intercity Express (74.32 km/hr).

This train now operates by Push Pull technique and the technical halt at Karjat for attaching bankers is removed. Today Intercity departs Mumbai CSMT at 6:45 AM and arrives Pune Junction at 9:55 AM and the reverse trains leaves Pune Junction at 6:30 PM and arrives Mumbai CSMT at 9:05 PM. Thus the traveling time is reduced to 2 hr 35 min and the Intercity becomes the fastest train among the six sister trains between Mumbai and Pune. From December 2019 onward, the Push Pull Technique has been discontinued, as there was no improvement in the time saved (beyond 20 min) even after eliminating stop at Karjat Junction. Furthermore, though Karjat Junction was not a scheduled halt for the regular (single loco) train, people were able to "get in" and "get out" when the train halted for a connection of WAG 7 twin bankers. Therefore, there was a negative feedback from such region specific customers who wanted the train to stop at Karjat Junction. 
However this train was converted to normal mode by central railways from 21/11/2019. Now the train runs on its regular time table taking 3 hrs 10 min between Pune to Mumbai and 3 hrs 17 min between Mumbai to Pune.

Traction

At its introduction, the Intercity Express has been hauled end to end by a KYN based WCAM 3 or WCAM 2 locomotive until present. It is the only train between Mumbai CSMT and Pune Junction never to have been hauled by a pure DC locomotive. Post 2014, after conversion of DC to AC on Central Line, it has been hauled occasionally by Bhusaval based WAP 4/WAM-4 or Ajni based WAP 7. However, the WCAM locos were mostly used to haul it both ways. At present, it is hauled by an Ajni-based WAP-7.

At Karjat, it gets two or three WAG-5, WAG-7 or WCAM 3 bankers of Kalyan shed to push the train on the ghat section between Karjat railway station and Lonavala railway station, where the gradient is of 1 in 40.
Now it is push pulled by an WAP-7, one in the front and the other at the rear, so the technical halt at Karjat is not required. The Push Pull Technology is used no more, as there was no significant time saving as proposed in the initial plan, see the paragraphs above for a detailed explanation.

Timetable

The Mumbai Pune Intercity Superfast Express is the 2nd of 6 dedicated trains to leave Mumbai CSMT for Pune Junction and is the second-to-last train to return.

12127 Mumbai Pune Intercity Superfast Express leaves Mumbai CSMT every day at 06:45 hrs IST and reaches Pune Junction at 09:20 hrs IST.

On return, the 12128 Pune Mumbai Intercity Superfast Express leaves Pune Junction every day at 18:30 hrs IST and reaches Mumbai CSMT at 21:05 hrs IST.

Sister train
 Dedicated Mumbai-Pune Intercity trains:

See also
 Mumbai–Pune Passenger

References 

Transport in Pune
Transport in Mumbai
Mumbai–Pune trains
Rail transport in Maharashtra
Intercity Express (Indian Railways) trains